Long Run is a tributary of Cranberry Creek in Luzerne County, Pennsylvania, in the United States. The stream is in the Eastern Middle Anthracite Field and a number of anticlinals are situated near it. In the early 1900s, it was a clear stream with a slight sulfur contamination. Coal is found in the stream's vicinity.

Course
Long Run has no flow for its entire length. It begins on a hill just north of Harwood, to the north of Pennsylvania Route 924 and to the east of Interstate 81. The stream flows north for a few tenths of a mile, flowing off the hill and into a valley. It continues flowing north for a short distance, passing several small ponds. The stream then reaches its confluence with Cranberry Creek.

Long Run arrives at its confluence with Cranberry Creek on the latter creek's left bank.

Hydrology
Long Run was described as being a clear stream in a 1916 report by the Pennsylvania Water Supply Commission. However, the same report noted that the stream had traces of sulfur contamination within its waters. This was due to the fact that the stream flowed over a coal outcrop.

Geography and geology

An anticlinal known as Cranberry Ridge crosses the headwaters of Long Run. An anticlinal known as Tomhicken Ridge is situated to the north of the stream. The stream is in the Hazleton Basin, which is the largest coal basin in the Eastern Middle Anthracite Field.

Long Run flows over an outcrop of coal in one location. There are coal measures near the source of the stream.

Watershed
Long Run is entirely within the United States Geological Survey quadrangle of Conyngham. Pennsylvania Route 924 and Interstate 81 are near the headwaters of the stream. The communities of Hollars Hill, Harwood, and Green Ridge are all within a mile (two kilometers) of it.

Long Run is one of eleven officially named streams in the watershed of Nescopeck Creek that has not been assessed by the Pennsylvania Fish and Boat Commission.

See also
List of rivers of Pennsylvania

References

Rivers of Luzerne County, Pennsylvania
Tributaries of Nescopeck Creek
Rivers of Pennsylvania